The Guinean gerbil (Gerbilliscus guineae) is a species of rodent found in Burkina Faso, Gambia, Ghana, Guinea, Guinea-Bissau, Ivory Coast, Mali, Senegal, Sierra Leone, and possibly Liberia. Its natural habitats are subtropical or tropical dry forests, dry savanna, rocky areas and arable land, but it is mostly found in areas laterite or clay soils, and with variable amounts of vegetation and dense scrub. This species is described as common and has a stable population and a wide distribution, so the International Union for Conservation of Nature has rated its conservation status as being of "least concern".

Description
The head has a slightly-rounded snout, large eyes and somewhat elongated ears. The upper parts of the body are greyish-brown, the individual hairs having dark grey bases, orange or brown shafts and black tips. The head and flanks are paler, the hairs lacking dark tips. The underparts, including the chin, throat, the inside of the limbs, the fore-feet and the upper side of the hind-feet are white. There is a clear division between the dorsal and ventral colouring. The tail is well-haired and bicoloured, being dark above and pale beneath, with a tuft of long dark hairs at the tip.

Ecology
The Guinean gerbil is nocturnal. Little is known about the animal's diet. In western Senegal, breeding takes place in the wet season and continues into the dry season. Litter sizes average four or five.

Status

References

Musser, G. G. and M. D. Carleton. 2005. Superfamily Muroidea. pp. 894–1531 in Mammal Species of the World a Taxonomic and Geographic Reference. D. E. Wilson and D. M. Reeder eds. Johns Hopkins University Press, Baltimore.

Gerbilliscus
Mammals described in 1910
Taxa named by Oldfield Thomas
Taxonomy articles created by Polbot